is a Japanese company, manufacturing cameras, lenses, flashes and other photographic accessories. All Sigma products are produced in the company's own Aizu factory in Bandai, Fukushima, Japan. Although Sigma produces several camera models, the company is best known for producing high-quality lenses and other accessories that are compatible with the cameras produced by other companies.

The company was founded in 1961 by Michihiro Yamaki, who was Sigma's CEO until his death at age 78 in 2012.

Sigma products work with cameras from Canon, Nikon, Pentax, Sony, Olympus and Panasonic, as well as their own cameras.

Sigma has also made lenses under the Quantaray name, which have been sold exclusively by Ritz Camera. Similarly, Sigma lenses were sold exclusively by the former Wolf Camera, but following the merger of Wolf and Ritz, both brands can be purchased.

Sigma's digital SLRs, the SD9, SD10, SD14 and SD15, plus the latest SD1 are unusual in their use of the Foveon X3 image sensor. The company's mirrorless cameras, the Sigma SD Quattro and SD Quattro H, use the Foveon Quattro sensor, an updated version of the Foveon X3. All use the SA lens mount. The Sigma DP series of high-end compact P&S cameras also use the Foveon Quattro sensor, which gives them a much larger sensor than other cameras of this type.

In September 2018 Sigma became one of the founding members of the L-Mount Alliance; it announced that it will cease to develop SA-mount cameras and instead use Leica's L-Mount. A new full-frame mirrorless camera, Sigma FP, was launched in 2019 along with a range of L-Mount lenses and adapters.

Sigma is the world's largest independent lens manufacturer and is a family-owned business.

Cameras
Sigma has made a number of film SLR cameras, including the SA-300, SA-5, SA-7 and  SA-9. Their latest consumer digital SLR is the SD15. During photokina 2010, Sigma announced a new flagship DSLR camera, the SD1. SD1 features a new 46MP Foveon X3 sensor with 1.5x crop, as opposed to the 1.7x crop of previous models.

All Sigma SLR, DSLR, and mirrorless cameras use the Sigma SA mount, which is mechanically similar to the Pentax K mount and electrically an adaptation of the Canon EF lens mount lens control system.

Sigma also produces the DP series of high-end compact digital cameras. The Foveon APS-C sized sensors are similar to those used in the DSLR line. The current line makes use of the Quattro sensor, a variant of the Foveon design that has a higher resolution top layer and lower resolution lower layers combined into a final image that is claimed to be equivalent to a 39 megapixel color filter array image. The four compact cameras are differentiated by their fixed prime lens, with the ultra wide DP0, the wide DP1, the normal DP2 and the telephoto DP3.

In February 2016, Sigma announced two new mirrorless cameras—the SD Quattro and SD Quattro H. Both cameras use the full-depth Sigma SA mount, allowing the use of existing SA-mount lenses, and also use Foveon Quattro sensors. The SD Quattro uses an APS-C sensor with 19.6 MP in the top layer, while the SD Quattro H uses an APS-H (1.35x crop) sensor with 25.5 MP in the top layer. The company claims that the Foveon Quattro technology produces a level of detail equivalent to that of a Bayer sensor with twice the pixel count.

Software
Sigma produces the Sigma Photo Pro software for post-production of their camera's .X3F raw image format. It is available both for Mac OS and Microsoft Windows.

Lenses

Sigma makes autofocus lenses for the Sigma SA, Canon EF, Nikon F, Minolta/Sony α, Pentax K and Four Thirds lens mounts. Each lens may not be available in all mounts, and may lack certain features (such as HSM) on certain mounts.

In August 2013, Sigma announced that starting the following month, it would offer a mount conversion service for its newest "Global Vision" lenses—those with either an "A" (Art), "C" (Contemporary), or "S" (Sport) as part of their model name. For a cost that varies with lens and market—from $80 to $250 in the U.S., not including shipping costs—owners can send their lenses to their local Sigma company, which in turn sends them to Japan for mount replacement, including calibration and optimization for the new camera system. Lenses designed for DSLRs can be converted to Canon EF, Nikon F, Pentax K, Sigma SA, or Sony A mounts; those designed for MILCs can be converted to Micro Four Thirds or Sony E-mount.

Designations

 ASP — Aspherical lens elements
 APO — Apochromatic lens element(s), originally for "Advanced Performance Optics", not necessarily apochromatic
 OS — In-lens "Optical Stabilization", analogous to Nikon VR or Canon IS
 HSM — "Hyper-Sonic Motor", either in-lens ultrasonic motor or micro-motor, analogous to Nikon SWM (AF-S) (ultra-sonic or micro-motor), Canon USM (ultrasonic or micro-motor), Minolta/Konica Minolta/Sony SSM (ultrasonic motor) or Sony SAM (micro-motor), etc.
 A — "Art Series", large aperture prime and zoom lenses, high optical performance. USB dock compatible. Part of 2013 lens lineup restructuring.
 C — "Contemporary Series", combining optical performance with compactness. USB dock compatible. Part of 2013 lens lineup restructuring.
 S — "Sports Series", telephoto and super-telephoto lenses. USB dock compatible. Part of 2013 lens lineup restructuring.
 EX — "Excellence", EX-finish, high performance series.
 DG — "Digital Grade", coatings optimized for DSLRs, full-frame as well as APS-C, also usable on 35mm film SLRs

 DC — "Digital Compact", lenses for DSLRs featuring APS-C size sensors, only
 DL — "Deluxe", indicates lower-end film era lenses
 DN — "Digital Neo", lenses for mirrorless interchangeable-lens cameras.
 DF — "Dual Focus", lens features clutch to disengage focus ring when in AF mode
 FLD — "'F' Low Dispersion" glass, the highest level low dispersion glass available with extremely high light transmission. This glass has a performance equal to fluorite glass which has a low refractive index and low dispersion compared to current optical glass
 HF — "Helical Focusing", front element of lens does not rotate (useful for polarizing filters and petal lens hoods)
 RF — "Rear Focusing", lenses employing rear-focusing, no length changes during focussing, no rotating front elements
 IF — "Inner Focusing", length of lens does not change during focusing, no rotating front elements
 UC — "Ultra-Compact"

Zoom lenses

Wide-angle zooms

Standard zooms

Telephoto zooms

Prime lenses

Wide-angle primes

Standard primes

Macro primes

Telephoto primes

DC lenses for APS-C
 4.5mm 2.8 EX DC Circular Fisheye HSM
 8–16mm 4.5-5.6 DC HSM
 10mm 2.8 EX DC Fisheye HSM
 30mm 1.4 EX DC HSM
 10–20mm f/3.5 EX DC HSM
 10–20mm 4–5.6 EX DC HSM
 17–50mm 2.8 EX DC OS HSM
 17–70mm 2.8–4.5 DC MACRO HSM
 17–70mm 2.8-4.0 DC OS MACRO HSM
 17–70mm 2.8-4.0 DC OS MACRO HSM 'C'
 18–35mm 1.8 DC HSM A
 18–50mm 2.8 EX DC
 18–50mm 2.8 EX DC MACRO
 18–50mm 2.8-4.5 DC OS HSM
 18–50mm 3.5–5.6 DC
 18–125mm 3.5–5.6 DC
 18–125mm 3.8–5.6 DC OS HSM
 18–200mm 3.5–6.3 DC
 18–200mm 3.5–6.3 DC OS (HSM Version for Nikon only)
 18–200mm 3.5-6.3 DC OS HSM II
 18–200mm 3.5-6.3 DC Macro OS HSM C
 18–250mm 3.5–6.3 DC OS HSM
 50-100mm 1.8 DC HSM 
 50–150mm 2.8 EX DC HSM
 50–150mm 2.8 EX DC HSM II
 50–150mm 2.8 EX DC OS HSM
 55–200mm 4–5.6 DC

DN lenses for mirrorless cameras
 56mm f/1.4 DC DN C
16mm f/1.4 DC DN Contemporary 
 19mm 2.8 EX DN
 19mm 2.8 DN A
 30mm 1.4 DC DN C
 30mm 2.8 EX DN
 30mm 2.8 DN A
 60mm 2.8 DN A

Lawsuit
In 2011, Nikon filed a suit against Sigma, alleging it had violated patents relating to Nikon's "Vibration Reduction" image stabilisation technology. In 2015, the suit ended through settlement, with no details disclosed.

See also

 List of digital camera brands
 Hyper Sonic Motor (HSM)
 List of Sigma lenses with Nikon F-mount and integrated autofocus motor
 Third-party lenses for Sony E-mount system

References

External links
 

 
 
Manufacturing companies of Japan
Photography companies of Japan
Electronics companies of Japan
Lens manufacturers
Companies based in Kanagawa Prefecture
Electronics companies established in 1961
1961 establishments in Japan
Japanese brands
Family-owned companies
Privately held companies of Japan